Rezki Zerarti  (born 24 July 1938) is an Algerian painter.

Biography
Rezki Zerarti was born in 1938 in Taourga within lower Kabylia during the period of French Algeria, and he left during the Algerian War in 1959 to the town of Aix-en-Provence in France where he worked as a mason, before starting to follow a few drawing lessons, and the same year he began to paint.

He returned to Algeria after Independence in August 1962, and settled in the district of Pointe-Pescade (Raïs Hamidou) in Algiers, and opened his painting studio in the vicinity of the accommodation of the poet Jean Sénac who met him in 1963.

Exhibitions
Reski Zérarti takes part in the two “Algerian Painters” exhibitions organized in Algiers for the “Fêtes du 1er novembre 1963” then in Paris in 1964.

His first personal exhibition was presented at Galerie 54 in 1964, and prefaced by Sénac.

He became a member of the UNAP, he participated in its salons and from 1967 to 1971 in the events of the group "Aouchem" (Tattoo) which brought together a dozen artists, poets and painters, notably with Baya, Denis Martinez and Choukri Mesli.

Awards
In 1972, he received the first prize for the “10th anniversary of Independence” and in 1979, the second prize for the “25th anniversary of November 1, 1954”. In 2003, he obtained the 1st prize in the competition organized by the Asselah foundation.

Activity resumption
After a long absence from the art scene for nearly twenty years, Zerarti resumed exhibiting his paintings in 1999.

See also
List of Algerian people
List of Algerian artists

References

External links
 
 
 

1938 births
Living people
Algerian people
People from Taourga
People from Baghlia District
People from Boumerdès Province
Kabyle people
Algerian artists
Algerian painters
Algerian contemporary artists
20th-century Algerian artists
21st-century Algerian artists